Richard Thomas James (27 February 1910 – 27 October 1965) was a politician from the U.S. state of Indiana. Between 1945 and 1948 he served as Lieutenant Governor of Indiana.

Life
Richard James was born in Portland, Jay County in Indiana. He attended the Portland High School. Afterwards he studied law at the Case Western Reserve University in Cleveland in Ohio. After his admission to the bar he started a career as attorney. He joined the Republican Party and in 1934 he was elected to the Indiana House of Representatives, where he remained until 1936. Between 1938 and 1940 he was the Deputy Secretary of State for Indiana and from 1941 through 1945 he served as State Auditor.

In 1944 Richard James was elected to the office of the Lieutenant Governor of Indiana. He served in this position between 8 January 1945 and 10 January 1948 when he resigned. In this function he was the deputy of governor Ralph F. Gates and he presided over the Indiana Senate. His resignation from the office of the Lieutenant Governor was a result of his appointment to the office of the Vice-President and Treasurer of the Butler University. He remained in these offices until 1952. In the following years he held several offices in various associations, institutions and organizations. He died on 27 October 1965 in Indianapolis.

External links

1910 births
1965 deaths
20th-century American politicians
People from Portland, Indiana
Case Western Reserve University alumni
Indiana lawyers
Republican Party members of the Indiana House of Representatives
Lieutenant Governors of Indiana
20th-century American lawyers